The Keller's Mill Covered Bridge is a covered bridge that spans Cocalico Creek in Ephrata Township, Lancaster County in the US state of Pennsylvania. A county-owned and maintained bridge, its official designation is the Cocalico No. 5 Bridge. It is also sometimes known as Guy Bard Covered Bridge (after a local jurist) and Rettew's Covered Bridge (after the person that Rettew's Road is named).

Due to heavy road traffic on the aging, one-lane bridge, construction on a new steel and concrete bridge to bypass the covered bridge occurred in the summer of 2006. According to Ephrata Township supervisor Clark Stauffer, the bridge has been disassembled and will be reassembled a few miles downstream to replace an existing one lane Mill Creek Road bridge. It was located at  (40.16983, −76.20467) before being disassembled.

History
Keller's Mill Covered Bridge was originally built by Elias McMellen in 1873 at a cost of US$2,075. After being swept away in flooding, the bridge was rebuilt in 1891, again by McMellen. It stayed there until it was disassembled and moved in 2006. The bridge was reconstructed in 2009. The bridge was reopened on Middle Creek Road in December 2010.

Design 
Keller's Mill Covered Bridge has a single span, wooden, double Burr arch trusses design with the addition of steel hanger rods. The deck is made from oak planks. The bridge is the only all white bridge in the county, not red. In fact, just about all covered bridges were whitewashed both inside and out. the only bridge to have survived the transition from whitewashing to the red color commonly used in barns throughout the county. The bridge is not painted on the inside.

Length:  span and  total length
Width:  clear deck and  total width
Overhead clearance: 
Underclearance:  

Rebuilt in 2010
Length:  span and  total length
Width:  clear deck and  total width
Overhead clearance: 
Underclearance:

See also 

 List of covered bridges in Lancaster County, Pennsylvania
 National Register of Historic Places listings in Lancaster County, Pennsylvania

References 

Bridges completed in 1873
Covered bridges on the National Register of Historic Places in Pennsylvania
Covered bridges in Lancaster County, Pennsylvania
National Register of Historic Places in Lancaster County, Pennsylvania
Road bridges on the National Register of Historic Places in Pennsylvania
Wooden bridges in Pennsylvania
Burr Truss bridges in the United States